Wolfgang Kröger (born August 27, 1945 in [Herne], Germany) has been full professor of Safety Technology at the ETH Zurich since 1990 and director of the Laboratory of Safety Analysis simultaneously. Before being elected Founding Rector of International Risk Governance Council (IRGC) in 2003, he headed research in nuclear energy and safety at the Paul Scherrer Institut (PSI). After his retirement early 2011 he became the Executive Director of the newly established ETH Risk Center.  He has both Swiss and German citizenship and lives in Kilchberg/Zürich. His seminal work lies in the general area of reliability, risk and vulnerability analysis of large-scale technical systems like nuclear power plants of different types and complex engineered networks like power supply systems, the latter coupled to other critical infrastructure and controlled by cyber-physical systems. He is known for his continuing efforts to advance related frameworks, methodology, and tools, to communicate results including uncertainties as well as for his successful endeavor in stimulating trans-disciplinary and trans-sectional cooperation to improve governance of emerging systemic risks. His contributions to shape and operationalize the concept of sustainability and - more recently - the concept of resilience are highly valued. Furthermore, he is in engaged in the evaluation of smart energy systems and future technologies, including new ways of exploiting nuclear energy, and cooperative automated vehicles as a cornerstone of future mobility concepts.

Professor Kröger is an individual member of the Swiss Academy of Technical Science and heads the topical  (SATW) platform “Autonomous Mobility”; he has been awarded “Distinguished Affiliate Professor” by Technische Universität München in 2012., and "Senior Fellow" of IASS Potsdam. Inter alia he is member of the international review group of the Japanese Nuclear Safety Institute (JANSI), the project of three German academies on “Energy Systems of the Future” (ESYS), and notable advisory boards. Most recent publications/books are dedicated to the vulnerability of interdependent critical infrastructure systems and to make them more resilient as well as to issues of energy systems.

Education and professional life 

Wolfgang Kröger studied mechanical engineering, specialized on nuclear technology, at the RWTH Aachen University, completed his doctorate in 1974, also at RWTH Aachen, and his habilitation thesis in 1986, which focused on safety requirements for urban-sited nuclear power plants. He joined the Institute for Nuclear Safety Research at National Research Center Jülich (FZJ, former KFA), Germany, in 1974, led projects on underground siting of nuclear power plants and on application of PSA-methodology to HTGR (High-Temperature Gas-cooled Reactor). He became deputy and finally acting director (1987) of that institute before he accepted the call to ETH Zurich and, simultaneously, became also research department head and member of the board of directors at Paul Scherrer Institute (PSI) in 1990. In 2003 he gave up the position at PSI and served as Founding Rector of the IRGC Geneva, and in parallel directed the Lab of Safety Analysis of ETH’s department of mechanical and process engineering (MAVT). After his retirement early 2011 to end of 2014 he was mandated founding executive director of the ETH Risk Center and established the project of Future Resilient Systems at CREATE in Singapore. At present he does research on more resilient socio-technical systems and, more sustainable (acceptable) energy technologies including novel super-safe nuclear concepts and smarter, more resilient grids. He is engaged in a project on learning from past nuclear events, contributes to safety assessment and validation of autonomous vehicles and works as advisor to scientific institutions.

Achievements

Scientific research 
Wolfgang Kröger has published slightly more than 40 papers, books, and edited volumes only in the last 10 years. He is co-editor of three distinguished journals. His scientific research deals with basic methodology and practical applicability, low probability-high consequence risks and the question of acceptable/tolerable safety, all in relation to complicated single facilities including nuclear power plants and large-scale complex cyber-physical systems. Five contributions are highlighted here: 
 He has extended the methodology of probabilistic safety analysis (PSA) for nuclear power plants by incorporation of passive safety systems and inherent safety properties in the "classical" framework driven by active safety systems. He helped to advance the exact quantification of logic trees with a myriad of basic events via binary decision diagrams (BBD) and the modeling of human (crew)-system-interactions during accident scenarios by accident dynamic simulator (ADS) and discrete dynamical event trees (DDET). His reflections of limitations of PSA, based on "lessons learned from Fukushima disaster", gained international recognition. More recently, a project has been started to complement traditional PSA by precursor analysis based on simplified generic models and data and by making use of a curated comprehensive open database with more than one 1250 safety significant worldwide events which has been established for open online use.
 He has pioneered the modeling and simulation of complex, widely ramified critical infrastructure networks and their interdependencies, turning them into "systems-of-systems", e.g., by pervasive use of modern IC host technology. Based on advanced methods, partly developed in other sectors and adapted to technical systems, and all following holistic system thinking, reliable statements to the emergent complex behavior and vulnerability of those systems can be made, meanwhile a broadened spectrum of natural hazards and threats including technical and human failures as well as malicious (cyber) attacks can be incorporated. The innovative methods include complex network theory, agent-based multilayer modeling in combination with Monte Carlo simulation and high level architecture (HLA). They have been cast into a new methodological framework, which allows for tailoring to the respective system specification and goals of the analysis. The work has supported the development of national strategies to better protect critical infrastructures and to reduce social vulnerabilities as well as the industry in building more robust networked systems. 
 He has worked in the front line of efforts to analyze systems/options in the energy sector holistically under consideration of the total life cycle and by this he is able to provide more reliable input to the assessment of energy technologies and multi-criteria decision processes. He has been significantly involved in making the terms "sustainability" and “resilience” operational, the first by a set of representative quantifiable indicators for three dimensions of sustainability and the second by proposing means to increase systems’ “soft landing capabilities”.
 He has deliberated on new needs and ways to exploit nuclear energy in a regime of self-controllability under accident conditions and eased burdens for waste disposal as well as less dependence on socio-political stability, all by innovative combination of key design factors. More stringent safety requirements have been elaborated and tested against candidate reactor and fuel cycle designs including SMRs.
 More recently he has started to address reliability and risk issues of vehicles of different level of autonomy and to develop methods to identify representative critical scenarios in order to complementarily ensure (validate) sufficient safety before test driving on public roads and approved release to the commercial market.

National and international cooperation 
Wolfgang Kröger recognized early on that the classical technical risk analysis has to be enriched and modified to changing situations in our modern society. At an early stage far-reaching changes of the character of large risks to so-called systemic risks, triggered by an increasing integration and globalization of systems, became obvious and he realized the urgent need to develop new approaches to deal with such risks. Supported by the Swiss Government, he put the management of man-made technological, trans-boundary risks into a broader context by establishing the International Risk Governance Council (IRGC) as an independent organization. Founded in 2003, the IRGC follows a trans-sectorial and multi-disciplinary approach and promotes multi-stakeholder participation, where appropriate. As its Founding Rector he has provided valuable contributions to its undeniable success to date. From mid-2011 to end of 2014 he helped to build up the ETH Risk Center, which pools the expertise of professors from various departments. Its joint research output should support society and industry to better manage risk portfolios and design novel solutions for collaborative risk reduction and resilience enhancing schemes. Furthermore, he accountably prepared the proposal for a huge integrated research project on Future Resilient Systems, integrating combinations from ETH and top Singaporean universities; it was finally approved by the National Research Foundation of Singapore (NRF) for funding and launched in November 2014. He joined the Institute of Advanced Sustainability Studies (IASS) Potsdam as Senior Fellow to help framing the concept of resilience and systematic risks in 2018. In the recent past, he contributed to ESYS by active participation in working groups on (de-)centralized energy systems and resilience of digitalized power systems. Further, the established a multi-stakeholder platform on Future Mobility to create a knowledge base, inform the public and trigger actions, where appropriate.

Books and selected publications

Selected books 
 Kröger, W., Stankovski, A., Nuclear fuel from cradle to grave: Existing variants and future options for the fuel cycle and resulting waste types, in Röhlig, K. (editor), IOP Books on Radwaste, accepted for publication, Jan 2022
 Gethmann, C.F., Kamp, G., Knodt, M., Kröger, W., Streffer, C., von Storch, H., Ziesemer, T., Global Energy Supply and Emissions, Springer: 978-981-13-7445-6 (ISBN), Oct, 2020
 Kröger, W., Achieving resilience of large-scale engineered infrastructures, in Farsangi et al. (eds.), Resilient Structures and Infrastructures, Springer, May 2019
 Sornette, D., Kröger, W., Wheatley, S., New Ways and Needs for Exploiting Nuclear Energy, Springer: 978-3-319-97651-8 (ISBN), 2019
 Kröger, W. and Nan, C., Power systems in transition: dealing with complexity. In Energy as a Sociotechnical Problem, Routledge: 978-1-351-73673-2 (ISBN), 2018
 Kröger, W., Sansavini, G., Principles of disaster risk reduction, in Handbook of Protecting Electricity Networks from Natural Hazards, OSCE, 2016
 Nan, C., Sansavini, G., Kröger, W., Building an Integrated Metric for Quantifying the Resilience of Interdependent Infrastructure Systems, Panayiotou C. et al.(eds.), Critical Information Infrastructures Security, Springer: 978-3-319-31663-5(ISBN), 2016
 Kröger, W., Switzerland - a Resilient energy infrastructure, in Thoma, K. (ed.), Resilien-Tech – “Resilience-by-Design": a strategy for the technology issues of the future, Acatech Study, April, 2014
 Kröger, W., Nan, C., Addressing Interdependencies of Complex Technical Networks, D'Agostino, G., Scala, A. (eds.), Networks of Networks, Springer: Complexity, 978-3-319-03517-8 (ISBN), 2014
 Streffer, C., Gethmann, C.F., Kamp, G., Kröger, W., Rehbinder, E., Renn, O., Radioactive Waste, Springer, 978-3-642-22924-4 (ISBN), 2012
 Kröger, W., Zio, E., Vulnerable Systems, Springer, 978-0-85729-654-2 (ISBN), 2011

Selected articles in journals 
 Ayoub, A., Kröger, W., Sornette, D., Generic and adaptive probabilistic safety assessment models: Precursor analysis and multi-purpose utilization, Nuclear Engineering and Technology (under review), Jan 2022
 Kröger, W., Ayoub, A., Autonomous driving: A survey with focus on reliability and risk issues, Special Issue of Environment Systems Decisions, submitted upon invitation, 7/2021 (under review)
 Kröger, W., Novel reactor concepts: Asset in a future energy mix ? in Swiss Physical Society Focus No.1, Nuclear Energy Generation, July 2021
 Ayoub, A., Stankovski, A., Kröger, W., Sornette, D., The ETH Zurich curated nuclear events data base: Layout, event classification, and analysis of contributing factors, Reliability Engineering & System Safety, 213 (2021), 107781
 Ayoub, A., Stankovski, A., Kröger, W., Sornette, D., Precursor and startling lessons: Statistical analysis of 1250 events with safety significance from the civil nuclear sector, Reliability Engineering & System Safety, 214 (2021), 107920
 Kröger, W., Sornette, D., Ayoub, A., Towards Safer and More Sustainable Ways for Exploiting Nuclear Power, World Journal of Nuclear Science and Technology,10, 91-115, 2020
 Kröger, W., Automated Vehicle Driving: Background and Deduction of Governance Needs, Journal of Risk Research, Vol. 24, Jan-Feb 2021
 Kröger, W., Small-sized Reactors of Different Types: Regulatory Framework to be Re-Thoughts ?. Modern Environmental Science and Engineering, October, 2017
 Kröger, W., Securing the Operation of Socially Critical Systems from an Engineering Perspective: New Challenges, Enhanced Tools and Novel Concepts. European Journal for Security Research, 1(2), 1-17, 2017
 Linkov, I., Creutzig, F., Decker, J., Fox-Lent, C., Kröger, W. et al., Commentary: Changing the Resilience Paradigm. Nature Climate Change, vol.4, June 2014
 Sornette, D., Maillart, T., Kröger, W., Exploring the Limits of Safety Analysis in Complex Technological Systems. International Journal of Disaster Risk Reduction, 6(0), 59-66, 2013
 Bilis, E.I., Kröger, W., Nan, C., Performance of Electric Power Systems under Physical Malicious Attacks. IEEE Systems Journal, 7(4), 854-865, 2013
 Nan, C., Eusgeld, I., Kröger, W., Analyzing Vulnerabilities between SCADA System and SUC due to Interdependencies. Reliability Engineering & System Safety, 113, 76-93, 2013
 Eusgeld, I., Kröger, W., Sansavini, G., Schläpfer, M., Zio, E., The Role of Network Theory and Object-oriented Modeling within a Framework for the Vulnerability Analysis of Critical Infrastructures. Reliability Engineering & System Safety, 94(5), 954-63, 2009
 Kröger, W., Critical Infrastructures at Risk, A Need for a New Conceptual Approach and Extended Analytical Tools. Reliability Engineering & System Safety, 93(12), 2008

References

Academic staff of ETH Zurich
Complex systems scientists
RWTH Aachen University alumni
1945 births
Living people